The 2012–13 South Dakota State Jackrabbits men's basketball team represented South Dakota State University during the 2012–13 NCAA Division I men's basketball season. The Jackrabbits, led by 18th year head coach Scott Nagy, played their home games at Frost Arena and were members of The Summit League. They finished the season 25–10, 13–3 in The Summit League play to finish in a tie for the regular season conference championship with Western Illinois. They were champions of The Summit League tournament, winning the championship game over North Dakota State, to earn an automatic bid to the 2013 NCAA tournament where they lost in the second round to Michigan.

Roster

Schedule

|-
!colspan=9| Exhibition

|-
!colspan=9| Regular season

|-
!colspan=9| 2013 The Summit League men's basketball tournament

|-
!colspan=9| 2013 NCAA tournament

References

South Dakota State Jackrabbits men's basketball seasons
South Dakota State
South Dakota State
South Dakota State Jackrabbits men's basketball team
South Dakota State Jackrabbits men's basketball team